Carmen Elizabeth Ejogo (born 22 October 1973) is a British actress and singer. She is best known for her roles in such films as Metro (1997), Love's Labour's Lost (2000), What's the Worst That Could Happen? (2001), Boycott (2001), Away We Go (2009), Sparkle (2012), Alex Cross (2012), The Purge: Anarchy (2014), Selma (2014), Fantastic Beasts and Where to Find Them (2016), It Comes at Night (2017), Alien: Covenant (2017), and Fantastic Beasts: The Crimes of Grindelwald (2018).

Ejogo also starred in the NBC crime drama series Kidnapped (2006–2007), the ABC thriller series Zero Hour (2013), the Starz anthology drama series The Girlfriend Experience (2017), the HBO anthology crime series True Detective (2019), the Netflix limited series Self Made (2020) and Showtime series Your Honor (2021) opposite Bryan Cranston.

She is set to appear in the Boots Riley show I'm a Virgo for Amazon.

Early life
Ejogo was born on 22 October 1973 in Kensington, London, England. She is the  daughter of a Scottish mother, Elizabeth (née Douglas), and a Nigerian father, Charles Ejogo. Ejogo remembers her mother as having been "a bit of a hippie" during her childhood. She attended the Oratory Roman Catholic Primary School and Glendower Preparatory School, and was then educated at Godolphin and Latymer School.

Career
She began her career as host of the Saturday Disney morning show from 1993 to 1995. Her film credits include Love's Labour's Lost (2000), What's the Worst That Could Happen? (2001), Away We Go (2009), Sparkle (2012), Alex Cross (2012), The Purge: Anarchy (2014), It Comes at Night (2017), and Alien: Covenant (2017). She is also known for her role as Seraphina Picquery in the Fantastic Beasts film series. She plays Amelia Reardon in the HBO series True Detective (2019).

Ejogo has appeared as civil rights activist Coretta Scott King in two films: Boycott (2001) and Selma (2014). While preparing for the role in Boycott, she met with King and was given King's blessing for her portrayal.

Music career
Ejogo has been involved in the music industry, having collaborated with several artists since the 1990s. She presented The Carmen Ejogo Video Show, her own video show on BSB's Power Station channel.

She wrote and sang lead vocals on the song "Candles" by English drum 'n' bass DJ Alex Reece—she appeared in the music video and is listed in the production credits as "Carmen". Ejogo also sang vocals and duets with ex-husband Tricky on a song called  "Slowly". She sang vocals for the film Love's Labour's Lost (2000).

Aside from "Candles", Ejogo appears on four songs of the Sparkle original soundtrack album from the movie of the same name, singing lead on "Yes I Do" (as a solo), and lead vocals with Jordin Sparks and Tika Sumpter singing backup on "Jump", "Hooked on Your Love" and "Something He Can Feel". She also starred as Rose Angelina in Catherine Cookson's Colour Blind.

Personal life 
Ejogo was briefly married to trip-hop artist Tricky. In 2000, she married American actor Jeffrey Wright, whom she met while making the HBO film Boycott. They have a son, Elijah (born on June 8, 1999), and a daughter, Juno (born on April 14, 2004). Ejogo and Wright have since divorced.

Filmography

Film

Television

Video games

Awards and nominations

References

External links

 
 

1973 births
Living people
20th-century English actresses
21st-century English actresses
Actresses from London
Black British actresses
English expatriates in the United States
English film actresses
English people of Nigerian descent
English people of Scottish descent
English television actresses
Mensans
People from Kensington
Black British women